The Danish Police Museum is dedicated to the history of law enforcement in Denmark. It is based in a former police station on Fælledvej, off Sankt Hans Torv, in the Nørrebro district of Copenhagen, Denmark.

History
The museum traces its history back to 1904 when a collection of artefacts was founded in the cellar under Copenhagen Court House. The current museum was inaugurated in 1993. It underwent a thorough refurbishment in 2004.

Building
Fælledvej Police Station, or Station 6, opened on 21 October 1884. It maintained a staff of 64 policemen: One chief police officer, four superior police officers, 11 inspectors and 46 ordinary policemen. The top floor contained a residence for the head of the police station. First floor contained accommodation for 16 unmarried policemen.  The police station closed on 25 May 1977.

Exhibitions
The ground floor contains an exhibition about the history of the Danish Police Corps from its foundation in 1682 until the present day. First floor contains an exhibition about a criminological exhibition, featuring different forms of crimes as well as police investigation. The museum also hosts a special exhibitions.

See also
 Copenhagen Police Headquarters

References

External links

  Official website

Museums in Copenhagen
1993 establishments in Denmark
Buildings and structures completed in 1884
Nørrebro
Law enforcement museums in Europe